SAN Disk may refer to:
Storage Area Network computer storage devices (SAN disks)
SanDisk Corporation (formerly known as SunDisk)